"The Lost Valley of Iskander" is an El Borak short story by Robert E. Howard.  It was not published within Howard's lifetime, the first publication was in the FAX Collector's Editions hardback The Lost Valley of Iskander in 1974. Its original title was "Swords of the Hills".

In this story, El Borak discovers a legendary valley in which live Greek descendants of Alexander the Great invading army.  Meanwhile, the vital package he carries must be carried to British India before the Hungarian, Hunyadi, can stop him or thousands will die.

Plot

El Borak must carry vital papers across Afghanistan into India, while being chased by the Hungarian Gustav Hunyadi.  In doing so, El Borak discovers a village populated by the descendants of Alexander the Great's army.

References

External links

 List of stories and publication details at Howard Works

Short stories by Robert E. Howard
1974 short stories
Short stories published posthumously